Prolibytherium is an extinct genus of prolibytheriid artiodactyl ungulate native to Middle Miocene North Africa and Pakistan, from around  16.9 to 15.97 million years ago. Fossils of Prolibytherium were found in the Marada Formation of Libya, Vihowa Formation of Pakistan, and the Moghara Formation of Egypt.

Description 

The taxonomic status of Prolibytherium remains in flux. At one time, it was described as a relative of Sivatherium (as a precursor to "Libytherium maurusium" (S. maurusium)). Later, it would be regarded as a palaeomerycid, or either as a climacoceratid, or as a basal member of Giraffoidea. With the discovery and study of a female skull in 2010, Prolibytherium is tentatively confirmed as a climacoceratid. A recent study published in 2022 found it to be part of a separate family, Prolibytheriidae.

References

External links 

 

Prehistoric even-toed ungulate genera
Mammal enigmatic taxa
Miocene mammals of Africa
Fossils of Egypt
Fossils of Libya
Miocene mammals of Asia
Fossils of Pakistan
Fossil taxa described in 1961